Álvaro Granados Ortega (born 8 October 1998) is a Spanish water polo player. He competed in the 2020 Summer Olympics.

Honours
CN Atlètic-Barceloneta
Spanish Championship: 2017–18, 2018–19, 2019–20, 2020–21, 2021–22 
Copa del Rey: 2018, 2019, 2020, 2021, 2022
Supercopa de España: 2017, 2018, 2019
Individual
Member of the World Team 2022 by total-waterpolo

Awards
Spanish Championship Top Scorer 2021–22 with CN Atlètic-Barceloneta
 2022 World Championship Team of the Tournament

References

1998 births
Living people
Sportspeople from Barcelona
Sportspeople from Terrassa
Water polo players at the 2020 Summer Olympics
Spanish male water polo players
Olympic water polo players of Spain
Water polo players at the 2015 European Games
European Games silver medalists for Spain
European Games medalists in water polo
World Aquatics Championships medalists in water polo
21st-century Spanish people